Asenathi Ntlabakanye (born 15 April 1999) is a South African rugby union player for the  in the Pro14 Rainbow Cup SA and  in the Currie Cup. His regular position is prop.

Ntlabakanye was named in the  squad for the Pro14 Rainbow Cup SA competition.

References

1999 births
South African rugby union players
Living people
Rugby union props
Lions (United Rugby Championship) players
Golden Lions players